Suzan-e Olya (also Romanized as Sūzan-e ‘Olyā; also known as Sūzan) is a village in Kiskan Rural District, in the Central District of Baft County, Kerman Province, Iran. At the 2006 census, its population was 35, in 13 families.

References 

Populated places in Baft County